The Conservationist is a 1974 novel by the South African writer Nadine Gordimer. The book was a joint winner of the Booker-McConnell Prize for fiction. It is described as more complex in design and technique than Gordimer's earlier novels.

Plot
In South Africa under apartheid, Mehring is a rich white businessman who is not satisfied with his life. His ex-wife has gone to America, his liberal son, Terry (who is probably gay) criticizes his conservative/capitalist ways, and his lovers and colleagues do not actually seem interested in him. On a whim he buys a 400-acre farm outside the city, afterwards trying to explain this purchase to himself as the search for a higher meaning in life. But it is clear that he knows next to nothing about farming, and that black workers run it – Mehring is simply an outsider, an intruder on the daily life of "his" farm. His objective in buying the farm is to make a tax deductible expense. "No farm is beautiful unless it's productive," says Mehring. Plus it is proper for his amorous escapades. Land was a thing of his race. He once visits his farm with his girlfriend, Antonia.

One day the black foreman, Jacobus, finds an unidentified dead body on the farm. Since the dead man is black, the police find no urgency to look into the case and simply bury the body on the spot where it was found. The idea of an unknown black man buried on his land begins to "haunt" Mehring. A flood brings the body back to the surface; although the farm workers do not know the stranger, they now give him a proper burial as if he were a family member. There are hints that Mehring's own burial will be less emotional than this burial of a stranger.

Theme
Political and resurrection themes are combined to convey a larger meaning. The sterility of white has been depicted in Mehring's attempts of keeping his farm. He tries to conserve both nature and apartheid, while nature fails him and doesn't return what he had given to it. The dead body laying claim to his land is the embodiment of Africa, having no land of its own while in fact possessing all of Africa.

Characters

Mehring
He is the protagonist, an antihero of the novel. In his middle age, he is an attractive figure and has already had a number of mistresses. He is a frequent traveller and a calculating businessman.

Antonia Mancebo
She is the mistress of Mehring with olive complexion and dark hair. She is a revolutionary activist and has often a brush with law. She has to leave Africa as her life is in danger.

Terry
Son of Mehring who has left him long ago.

Jacobus
Works as a foreman at Mehring's farm. He breaks the news of the dead body to Mehring.

References

1974 novels
20th-century South African novels
Apartheid novels
Booker Prize-winning works
Novels by Nadine Gordimer
Novels set in South Africa
Jonathan Cape books